A pay driver is a driver for a professional auto racing team who, instead of being paid by the owner of their car, drives for free and brings with them either personal sponsorship or personal or family funding to finance the team's operations. This may be done to gain on-track experience or to live the lifestyle of a driver in a particular series when one's talent or credentials do not merit a paying ride. Alternatively, said person is also called a ride buyer or a rich kid in the United States, a gentleman driver in sports car and GT racing and a privateer in Australia.

Pay drivers have been the norm in many of the feeder series of motorsport, particularly in Formula 2, Formula 3, NASCAR Xfinity Series, and Indy Lights. However, there have been many pay drivers in top level series like Formula One, Champ Car, IndyCar Series, and the NASCAR Cup Series.

Formula One
At one time F1 regulations regarding the changing of drivers during the course of a season were extremely liberal, which encouraged some teams to recruit a string of pay drivers to drive their cars, sometimes only for one or two races. Frank Williams Racing Cars (the predecessor to Frank Williams and Patrick Head's highly successful Williams F1 team) were particularly prolific with regard to the number of drivers they would use in a season - ten drivers drove for the team in both 1975 and 1976. Because of this the rules on driver changes were subsequently tightened.

Teams willing to accept pay drivers are often at the back of the grid and struggling financially. While a pay driver often brings an infusion of much needed funding, their terms often require share ownership and / or influence in the team's operations. This dependence can also be harmful, should a pay driver leave the team then this could leave the team unable to replace the funding linked with that driver, as previous poor results could make finding a sponsor difficult. One case involved the collapse of the Forti team after wealthy Brazilian driver Pedro Diniz left Forti and moved to Ligier after the 1995 season; Forti withdrew from Formula One after the 1996 German Grand Prix.

Former Formula One drivers Ricardo Rosset and Alex Yoong were notorious for how much money their families spent to finance their F1 racing careers. They, and other pay drivers like Giovanni Lavaggi and Jean-Denis Délétraz, are usually associated with poorer performances compared to those with paid drives. Diniz was backed by his family, but throughout his career he managed to score some decent results compared to the other pay drivers of the time, scoring 10 championship points over six years (two fifth-place finishes and six sixth-place finishes, when only the top six drivers scored points, unlike the later eight and ten of today; he would have 26 points-scoring finishes using the system introduced in 2010), when many other pay drivers did not score any.

However, many successful drivers, such as multiple F1 world champions Niki Lauda and Michael Schumacher also started their careers as pay drivers but gradually worked their way up the racing ladder. Niki Lauda borrowed money against his life insurance to secure drives in Formula 2 and Formula 1, before impressing enough to have his debts cleared by BRM and then Ferrari. With the exception of Lauda, it is to be noted that they were regarded as highly talented and promising drivers before their F1 careers commenced and were funded by manufacturers rather than family money or companies with no racing interest.

In recent years, two particular teams that notoriously made headlines for hiring pay drivers were Racing Point and Williams. After Racing Point was purchased by a consortium led by Lawrence Stroll, his son Lance took over one of the team's seats in 2019. Williams, who regularly struggled to attract funding, hired Formula 2 racer Sergey Sirotkin in 2018 to pair with Stroll. The move raised doubts from critics due to Sirotkin's inexperience compared to the popular Robert Kubica, prompting team principal Claire Williams to denounce the pay driver label as "unfair". Kubica himself was then labelled with the tag when he took over from Sirotkin as his own seat was funded by a large sponsorship deal from Orlen.

Although occasionally pay drivers are labelled as "unworthy" for an F1 seat, many of the pay drivers in F1 today come with occasional success in their individual races in lower formulas. Pastor Maldonado, Vitaly Petrov, Bruno Senna, Max Chilton, Roberto Merhi, Will Stevens, Marcus Ericsson, Felipe Nasr, Esteban Gutiérrez, Rio Haryanto, Jolyon Palmer, Sergey Sirotkin, Brendon Hartley, Antonio Giovinazzi, Mick Schumacher, Nicholas Latifi, Nikita Mazepin, Lance Stroll, Yuki Tsunoda and Zhou Guanyu are all race winners during their times at the feeder series, with Pastor Maldonado and Jolyon Palmer both winning GP2, Lance Stroll winning F3 European Championship and Mick Schumacher winning F2. Maldonado would cement his place in Formula One history with a win at the 2012 Spanish Grand Prix as the first Venezuelan to win in F1 with what became the only pole, podium and win of his career. It was also the first win for Williams since 2004 and their last as of 2023. While Petrov got a podium at the 2011 Australian Grand Prix.

Other series
Some sanctioning bodies will offer champions of lower tier series a well-funded ride for the next tier.  The Road to Indy programme from INDYCAR awards a ride fully funded by The Goodyear Tire and Rubber Company (was funded by Mazda originally, then Cooper Tire, and now Goodyear) for a series champion in the next tier.  A $150,000 and tires package is available to a shootout winner among an invited group young American and foreign drivers.  A driver who wins the U.S. F2000 National Championship will win $300,000 to be used for a "pay ride" in the Pro Mazda Championship, and two sets of tires per race.  Pro Mazda winners will be paid for a ride in Indy Lights, and the Indy Lights champion earns funding to compete in at least three IndyCar Series races, including the Indianapolis 500.

Pay drivers are also common in stock car racing and are very prevalent in development series such as the Xfinity Series and ARCA Racing Series. There are also several pay drivers competing at the Cup level including Matt Tifft and Paul Menard, the son of home improvement tycoon John. Menard had some success with a victory at the Brickyard 400 in 2011 and a Chase for the Sprint Cup appearance in 2015, while medical issues halted Tifft's racing career in 2019. Pay drivers were controversial in stock car racing if payments failed; an example would be in 2015, when Kyle Busch's Camping World Truck Series team, Kyle Busch Motorsports, sued former driver Justin Boston, a pay driver, and the sponsor for missed payments.

There has also been a long history of pay drivers in Australian touring car racing. Historically referred to as "privateers", these people usually consisted of do-it-yourself businessmen looking to promote their companies through racing – the concept peaking in the late 1990s with the birth of the V8 Supercars and the creation of a Privateers Cup. This series eventually branched off and became the Konica Lites Series (now the Super2 Series), with the construct disappearing as the racing became more expensive and professionalised.

References

External links
Pay as you go, go, go: F1's 'pay drivers' explained BBC. Andrew Benson.

Motorsport terminology